The 1983–84 NBA season was the Jazz's tenth season in the NBA and its 4th in Utah. The Jazz averaged 115.0 points per game (ranked 5th in NBA) while allowing an average of 113.8 points per game (ranked 20th in NBA). It was their first playoff appearance in franchise history.

The Jazz played a number of home games (11 in total) at the then-newly built Thomas & Mack Center in the Las Vegas Valley, in an attempt to drum up regional support. In one of those games, Los Angeles Lakers center Kareem Abdul-Jabbar scored the points that would make him the NBA's all-time leading scorer.

As a result of the Las Vegas experiment, Jazz games were broadcast in the Las Vegas area for this season (seen above).

Draft picks

Roster

Regular season
 April 5, 1984: Kareem Abdul-Jabbar had a 12-foot shot over Mark Eaton to surpass Wilt Chamberlain as the NBA's all-time leading scorer with 31,421 points.

Season standings

Record vs. opponents

Game log

Regular season

|- align="center" bgcolor="#ffcccc"
| 1
| October 28
| @ Denver
| L 125–139
|
|
|
| McNichols Sports Arena
| 0–1
|- align="center" bgcolor="#ffcccc"
| 2
| October 29
| Los Angeles
| L 115–120
|
|
|
| Salt Palace
| 0–2

|- align="center" bgcolor="#ccffcc"
| 3
| November 3
| Golden State
| W 129–112
|
|
|
| Salt Palace
| 1–2
|- align="center" bgcolor="#ccffcc"
| 4
| November 5
| San Antonio
| W 124–118
|
|
|
| Salt Palace
| 2–2
|- align="center" bgcolor="#ffcccc"
| 5
| November 9
| @ San Antonio
| L 99–105
|
|
|
| HemisFair Arena
| 2–3
|- align="center" bgcolor="#ccffcc"
| 6
| November 10
| @ Houston
| W 118–109
|
|
|
| The Summit
| 3–3
|- align="center" bgcolor="#ccffcc"
| 7
| November 12
| Portland
| W 136–122
|
|
|
| Salt Palace
| 4–3
|- align="center" bgcolor="#ffcccc"
| 8
| November 13
| @ Los Angeles
| L 118–124
|
|
|
| The Forum
| 4–4
|- align="center" bgcolor="#ffcccc"
| 9
| November 15
| @ Portland
| L 112–114
|
|
|
| Memorial Coliseum
| 4–5
|- align="center" bgcolor="#ccffcc"
| 10
| November 16
| Boston
| W 122–109
|
|
|
| Salt Palace
| 5–5
|- align="center" bgcolor="#ffcccc"
| 11
| November 18
| @ Detroit
| L 120–128
|
|
|
| Pontiac Silverdome
| 5–6
|- align="center" bgcolor="#ffcccc"
| 12
| November 19
| @ Washington
| L 113–126
|
|
|
| Capital Centre
| 5–7
|- align="center" bgcolor="#ccffcc"
| 13
| November 22
| @ Los Angeles
| W 130–126 (OT)
|
|
|
| The Forum
| 6–7
|- align="center" bgcolor="#ffcccc"
| 14
| November 23
| Chicago
| L 117–128
|
|
|
| Thomas & Mack Center
| 6–8
|- align="center" bgcolor="#ccffcc"
| 15
| November 25
| Denver
| W 126–124
|
|
|
| Salt Palace
| 7–8
|- align="center" bgcolor="#ffcccc"
| 16
| November 26
| @ Kansas City
| L 116–117
|
|
|
| Kemper Arena
| 7–9
|- align="center" bgcolor="#ccffcc"
| 17
| November 29
| Phoenix
| W 114–110
|
|
|
| Thomas & Mack Center
| 8–9
|- align="center" bgcolor="#ccffcc"
| 18
| November 30
| @ San Diego
| W 117–115
|
|
|
| San Diego Sports Arena
| 9–9

|- align="center" bgcolor="#ccffcc"
| 19
| December 2
| @ Phoenix
| W 116–113
|
|
|
| Arizona Veterans Memorial Coliseum
| 10–9
|- align="center" bgcolor="#ccffcc"
| 20
| December 3
| Kansas City
| W 112–107
|
|
|
| Salt Palace
| 11–9
|- align="center" bgcolor="#ccffcc"
| 21
| December 7
| Portland
| W 116–111
|
|
|
| Salt Palace
| 12–9
|- align="center" bgcolor="#ffcccc"
| 22
| December 9
| San Antonio
| L 117–126
|
|
|
| Thomas & Mack Center
| 12–10
|- align="center" bgcolor="#ccffcc"
| 23
| December 10
| @ Houston
| W 128–121
|
|
|
| The Summit
| 13–10
|- align="center" bgcolor="#ccffcc"
| 24
| December 13
| @ Cleveland
| W 107–105
|
|
|
| Richfield Coliseum
| 14–10
|- align="center" bgcolor="#ccffcc"
| 25
| December 15
| Houston
| W 138–111
|
|
|
| Salt Palace
| 15–10
|- align="center" bgcolor="#ccffcc"
| 26
| December 17
| Golden State
| W 127–111
|
|
|
| Salt Palace
| 16–10
|- align="center" bgcolor="#ccffcc"
| 27
| December 21
| Indiana
| W 133–115
|
|
|
| Salt Palace
| 17–10
|- align="center" bgcolor="#ccffcc"
| 28
| December 23
| Denver
| W 118–116
|
|
|
| Salt Palace
| 18–10
|- align="center" bgcolor="#ccffcc"
| 29
| December 27
| @ Golden State
| W 111–102
|
|
|
| Oakland–Alameda County Coliseum Arena
| 19–10
|- align="center" bgcolor="#ccffcc"
| 30
| December 28
| @ Seattle
| W 113–105
|
|
|
| Kingdome
| 20–10
|- align="center" bgcolor="#ffcccc"
| 31
| December 30
| @ Denver
| L 130–135
|
|
|
| McNichols Sports Arena
| 20–11

|- align="center" bgcolor="#ffcccc"
| 32
| January 3
| @ San Antonio
| L 124–137
|
|
|
| HemisFair Arena
| 21–11
|- align="center" bgcolor="#ccffcc"
| 33
| January 4
| Houston
| W 116–111
|
|
|
| Thomas & Mack Center
| 22–11
|- align="center" bgcolor="#ccffcc"
| 34
| January 6
| Kansas City
| W 130–110
|
|
|
| Salt Palace
| 22–12
|- align="center" bgcolor="#ccffcc"
| 35
| January 10
| Phoenix
| W 107–98
|
|
|
| Salt Palace
| 23–12
|- align="center" bgcolor="#ffcccc"
| 36
| January 11
| @ Dallas
| L 102–117
|
|
|
| Reunion Arena
| 23–13
|- align="center" bgcolor="#ccffcc"
| 37
| January 13
| @ San Diego
| W 122–119
|
|
|
| San Diego Sports Arena
| 24–13
|- align="center" bgcolor="#ccffcc"
| 38
| January 14
| Washington
| W 121–96
|
|
|
| Salt Palace
| 25–13
|- align="center" bgcolor="#ffcccc"
| 39
| January 17
| @ Atlanta
| L 106–112
|
|
|
| The Omni
| 25–14
|- align="center" bgcolor="#ccffcc"
| 40
| January 20
| @ Dallas
| W 120–113
|
|
|
| Reunion Arena
| 26–14
|- align="center" bgcolor="#ffcccc"
| 41
| January 21
| @ Houston
| L 105–115
|
|
|
| The Summit
| 26–15
|- align="center" bgcolor="#ffcccc"
| 42
| January 24
| Dallas
| L 115–123
|
|
|
| Thomas & Mack Center
| 26–16
|- align="center" bgcolor="#ccffcc"
| 43
| January 26
| New Jersey
| W 125–115
|
|
|
| Salt Palace
| 27–16
|- align="center" bgcolor="#ccffcc"
| 44
| January 31
| Seattle
| W 98–94 (OT)
|
|
|
| Thomas & Mack Center
| 27–17

|- align="center" bgcolor="#ccffcc"
| 45
| February 2
| Phoenix
| W 116–95
|
|
|
| Salt Palace
| 29–16
|- align="center" bgcolor="#ffcccc"
| 46
| February 3
| @ Los Angeles
| L 105–109
|
|
|
| The Forum
| 29–17
|- align="center" bgcolor="#ccffcc"
| 47
| February 4
| Milwaukee
| W 116–102
|
|
|
| Salt Palace
| 30–17
|- align="center" bgcolor="#ffcccc"
| 48
| February 7
| San Diego
| L 103–109
|
|
|
| Thomas & Mack Center
| 30–18
|- align="center" bgcolor="#ffcccc"
| 49
| February 10
| New York
| L 111–121
|
|
|
| Salt Palace
| 30–19
|- align="center" bgcolor="#ccffcc"
| 50
| February 12
| @ Portland
| W 114–112
|
|
|
| Memorial Coliseum
| 31–19
|- align="center" bgcolor="#ccffcc"
| 51
| February 14
| Atlanta
| W 100–98
|
|
|
| Salt Palace
| 32–19
|- align="center" bgcolor="#ffcccc"
| 52
| February 16
| @ Kansas City
| L 99–121
|
|
|
| Kemper Arena
| 32–20
|- align="center" bgcolor="#ffcccc"
| 53
| February 17
| @ Milwaukee
| L 91–105
|
|
|
| MECCA Arena
| 32–21
|- align="center" bgcolor="#ffcccc"
| 54
| February 19
| @ Indiana
| L 104–106
|
|
|
| Market Square Arena
| 32–22
|- align="center" bgcolor="#ccffcc"
| 55
| February 21
| @ Chicago
| W 117–95
|
|
|
| Chicago Stadium
| 33–22
|- align="center" bgcolor="#ccffcc"
| 56
| February 23
| San Antonio
| W 143–142 (2OT)
|
|
|
| Salt Palace
| 34–22
|- align="center" bgcolor="#ffcccc"
| 57
| February 24
| @ Seattle
| L 81–112
|
|
|
| Kingdome
| 34–23
|- align="center" bgcolor="#ffcccc"
| 58
| February 25
| Dallas
| L 95–97
|
|
|
| Salt Palace
| 34–24
|- align="center" bgcolor="#ffcccc"
| 59
| February 28
| @ Phoenix
| L 100–113
|
|
|
| Arizona Veterans Memorial Coliseum
| 34–25
|- align="center" bgcolor="#ffcccc"
| 60
| February 29
| Philadelphia
| L 97–103
|
|
|
| Salt Palace
| 34–26

|- align="center" bgcolor="#ccffcc"
| 61
| March 2
| Cleveland
| W 110–104
|
|
|
| Salt Palace
| 35–26
|- align="center" bgcolor="#ffcccc"
| 62
| March 3
| @ Denver
| L 122–131
|
|
|
| McNichols Sports Arena
| 35–27
|- align="center" bgcolor="#ffcccc"
| 63
| March 5
| @ New Jersey
| L 116–120
|
|
|
| Brendan Byrne Arena
| 35–28
|- align="center" bgcolor="#ffcccc"
| 64
| March 7
| @ Boston
| L 106–117
|
|
|
| Boston Garden
| 35–29
|- align="center" bgcolor="#ffcccc"
| 65
| March 10
| @ New York
| L 105–114
|
|
|
| Madison Square Garden
| 35–30
|- align="center" bgcolor="#ffcccc"
| 66
| March 11
| @ Philadelphia
| L 97–120
|
|
|
| The Spectrum
| 35–31
|- align="center" bgcolor="#ccffcc"
| 67
| March 13
| Portland
| W 124–119
|
|
|
| Thomas & Mack Center
| 36–31
|- align="center" bgcolor="#ccffcc"
| 68
| March 15
| @ Golden State
| W 115–111
|
|
|
| Oakland–Alameda County Coliseum Arena
| 37–31
|- align="center" bgcolor="#ccffcc"
| 69
| March 17
| Dallas
| W 118–103
|
|
|
| Salt Palace
| 38–31
|- align="center" bgcolor="#ccffcc"
| 70
| March 19
| Detroit
| W 143–125
|
|
|
| Salt Palace
| 39–31
|- align="center" bgcolor="#ffcccc"
| 71
| March 22
| @ San Antonio
| L 126–129
|
|
|
| HemisFair Arena
| 39–32
|- align="center" bgcolor="#ffcccc"
| 72
| March 23
| Golden State
| L 104–115
|
|
|
| Thomas & Mack Center
| 39–33
|- align="center" bgcolor="#ccffcc"
| 73
| March 25
| @ Seattle
| W 121–98
|
|
|
| Kingdome
| 40–33
|- align="center" bgcolor="#ccffcc"
| 74
| March 27
| Kansas City
| W 110–106
|
|
|
| Salt Palace
| 41–33
|- align="center" bgcolor="#ccffcc"
| 75
| March 29
| Seattle
| W 106–96
|
|
|
| Salt Palace
| 42–33
|- align="center" bgcolor="#ffcccc"
| 76
| March 31
| @ Kansas City
| L 103–105
|
|
|
| Kemper Arena
| 42–34

|- align="center" bgcolor="#ccffcc"
| 77
| April 2
| Houston
| W 111–100
|
|
|
| Salt Palace
| 43–34
|- align="center" bgcolor="#ffcccc"
| 78
| April 5
| Los Angeles
| L 115–129
|
|
|
| Thomas & Mack Center
| 43–35
|- align="center" bgcolor="#ffcccc"
| 79
| April 7
| @ Dallas
| L 100–109
|
|
|
| Reunion Arena
| 43–36
|- align="center" bgcolor="#ccffcc"
| 80
| April 10
| Denver
| W 135–120
|
|
|
| Thomas & Mack Center
| 44–36
|- align="center" bgcolor="#ccffcc"
| 81
| April 12
| San Diego
| W 113–94
|
|
|
| Salt Palace
| 45–36
|- align="center" bgcolor="#ffcccc"
| 82
| April 14
| @ San Diego
| L 128–146
|
|
|
| San Diego Sports Arena
| 45–37

Playoffs

|- align="center" bgcolor="#ccffcc"
| 1
| April 17
| Denver
| W 123–121
| Adrian Dantley (30)
| Adrian Dantley (9)
| Rickey Green (12)
| Salt Palace10,255
| 1–0
|- align="center" bgcolor="#ffcccc"
| 2
| April 19
| Denver
| L 116–132
| Adrian Dantley (27)
| Dantley, Wilkins (6)
| Rickey Green (6)
| Salt Palace12,413
| 1–1
|- align="center" bgcolor="#ffcccc"
| 3
| April 22
| @ Denver
| L 117–121
| Adrian Dantley (29)
| Thurl Bailey (11)
| Rickey Green (12)
| McNichols Sports Arena14,681
| 1–2
|- align="center" bgcolor="#ccffcc"
| 4
| April 24
| @ Denver
| W 129–124
| Adrian Dantley (39)
| Adrian Dantley (8)
| Adrian Dantley (7)
| McNichols Sports Arena16,108
| 2–2
|- align="center" bgcolor="#ccffcc"
| 5
| April 26
| Denver
| W 127–111
| Adrian Dantley (30)
| Adrian Dantley (12)
| Rickey Green (16)
| Salt Palace12,731
| 3–2
|-

|- align="center" bgcolor="#ccffcc"
| 1
| April 29
| Phoenix
| W 105–95
| Adrian Dantley (36)
| Thurl Bailey (13)
| Rickey Green (16)
| Salt Palace12,403
| 1–0
|- align="center" bgcolor="#ffcccc"
| 2
| May 2
| Phoenix
| L 97–102
| Adrian Dantley (26)
| Mark Eaton (9)
| Rickey Green (6)
| Salt Palace12,689
| 1–1
|- align="center" bgcolor="#ffcccc"
| 3
| May 4
| @ Phoenix
| L 94–106
| Adrian Dantley (31)
| Mark Eaton (11)
| Rickey Green (4)
| Arizona Veterans Memorial Coliseum14,660
| 1–2
|- align="center" bgcolor="#ffcccc"
| 4
| May 6
| @ Phoenix
| L 110–111 (OT)
| Adrian Dantley (37)
| Mark Eaton (12)
| Darrell Griffith (8)
| Arizona Veterans Memorial Coliseum14,660
| 1–3
|- align="center" bgcolor="#ccffcc"
| 5
| May 8
| Phoenix
| W 118–106
| Adrian Dantley (46)
| Mark Eaton (11)
| Rickey Green (14)
| Salt Palace12,560
| 2–3
|- align="center" bgcolor="#ffcccc"
| 6
| May 10
| @ Phoenix
| L 82–102
| Adrian Dantley (23)
| Mark Eaton (10)
| Rickey Green (6)
| Arizona Veterans Memorial Coliseum14,660
| 2–4
|-

Player statistics

Season

Playoffs

Awards and honors
 Frank Layden, NBA Coach of the Year Award
 Adrian Dantley, All-NBA Second Team
 Thurl Bailey, NBA All-Rookie Team 1st Team
 Adrian Dantley, NBA leader, Points per game

Transactions

References

External links
 1983–84 Jazz on Basketball Reference

Utah Jazz seasons
Utah
Utah Jazz
Utah Jazz